Parliamentary elections were held in South Korea on 29 June 1960. They were the first and only direct elections of the Second Republic and saw the first election of members of the new House of Councillors, together with the fifth election of members of the House of Representatives. They were also the first relatively free and fair national elections held in the country, but would be the last free elections until the 1987 presidential elections. Voter turnout was 84.3%.

The elections took place after President Rhee Syngman amended the constitution and won a third term in the uncontested March 1960 presidential election, which prompted the pro-democracy April Revolution and removed Rhee from power.

The Democratic Party, which had been the opposition party under former President Rhee, received the most votes (42%) in the House of Representatives election, winning 175 of 233 seats, while its 51% vote share in the House of Councillors elections saw it win 31 of the 58 seats. It was the first time that a liberal party won an election in South Korea, but the Democratic Party and its liberal successors would not win an election again until the 1997 presidential election and would not win a legislative election until 2004. Independent politicians received a significant portion of the vote, with 47% of the vote in the House of Representatives elections and 38% of the vote in the House of Councillors elections.

The government formed after the elections was overthrown within less than a year by Park Chung-hee in a coup on 16 May 1961. Park subsequently re-established the presidential system under a military government and served as president of South Korea from 1962 to 1979.

Results

House of Representatives

By city/province

House of Councillors

By city/province

References

Legislative elections in South Korea
1960 elections in South Korea
June 1960 events in Asia
Election and referendum articles with incomplete results